Seth Grosvenor Heacock (March 1, 1857 – December 4, 1928) was an American politician from New York.

Life
He was born on March 1, 1857, in Buffalo, New York, the son of Rev. Grosvenor W. Heacock D.D., a Presbyterian minister, and Nancy Rice (Stone) Heacock. He graduated from Hamilton College in 1880. On July 22, 1880, he married Ida May Walker (born 1858), and they had two children. They lived in Ilion, Herkimer County, New York, and became wealthy after oil was found on a farm he owned in Ohio.

Heacock was a member of the New York State Senate from 1907 to 1914, sitting in the 130th, 131st (both 33rd D.), 132nd, 133rd,  134th, 135th, 136th and 137th New York State Legislatures (all six 32nd D.).

He ran for Lieutenant Governor of New York in the Republican primaries for the State elections in 1914 and 1918, but was both times defeated by Edward Schoeneck.

Heacock was a presidential elector in 1916, voting for Charles Evans Hughes and Charles W. Fairbanks.

Heacock died on December 4, 1928, in Presbyterian Hospital in Manhattan.

Sources

External links

1857 births
1928 deaths
Republican Party New York (state) state senators
People from Ilion, New York
Politicians from Buffalo, New York
Hamilton College (New York) alumni
1916 United States presidential electors